The Tor is an all-weather, low- to medium-altitude, short-range surface-to-air missile system designed for destroying airplanes, helicopters, cruise missiles, unmanned aerial vehicles and short-range ballistic threats (anti-munitions). Originally developed by the Soviet Union under the GRAU designation 9K330 Tor, the system is commonly known by its NATO reporting name, SA-15 "Gauntlet". A navalized variant was developed under the name 3K95 "Kinzhal", also known as the SA-N-9 "Gauntlet". Tor was designed to shoot down guided weapons like the AGM-86 ALCM and BGM-34 day and night, in bad weather and jamming situations. Tor can detect targets while on the move. The vehicle must stop intermittently when firing, although trials have been conducted with the aim of eliminating this restriction.

Development 
The development of the Tor missile system started on 4 February 1975, in response to the directives of the Central Committee of the CPSU. Initiated as a successor to the 9K33 Osa (NATO reporting name SA-8 "Gecko"), development of the land based version was conducted in parallel with the naval variant of the system (3K95 Kinzhal/SA-N-9 "Gauntlet"), to be installed on a number of upcoming ship classes, including the s, and retrofitted onto older ships. Responsibility for development was given to the Antey design bureau (headed by V.P. Efremov), the missiles designed by MKB Fakel (under P.D. Grushin) and the Altair design bureau (headed by S.A. Fadeyev) was responsible for the development of Kinzhal. All the developers and manufacturers of the Tor missile system unified into Almaz-Antey in 2002.

In early 2023, it was reported that the Tor system had received some "fine-tuning" to improve dealing with missiles fired by the US-made HIMARS system.

Characteristics

Description 

The closest foreign equivalent to the Tor, in function and operation, are systems like the British Rapier missile and French Crotale missile systems, which some consider to have somewhat less performance than Tor (the other two systems being based on older equipment). All three systems are mobile and self-propelled, Tor using the 9A330 combat vehicle, which carries a crew of four (one driver, three operators), and acts as an autonomous Transporter, Launcher, And Radar unit, or TLAR (similar to but not a TELAR, as it does not erect the missile to a launch position). The 9A330 is based on the GM-355 chassis manufactured by MMZ, the Tor-M1 using the improved GM-5955. It is equipped with NBC (nuclear, biological and chemical) protection. Like Rapier and Crotale, in addition to the tracked vehicle, there are also static and towed versions of the Tor, as well as a wheeled one. Mobility time is 3 minutes and it can be transported by any transport means (including aerial). The reaction time of the original Tor is 7–8 (standard) / 7–10 (if it is in motion) seconds.

TLAR features 
Arranged in a similar fashion to the previous 9K33 Osa and 9K22 Tunguska air defense systems, Tor's TLAR features a turret with a top mounted target acquisition radar, and frontal tracking radar, with 8 ready to fire missiles stored vertically between the two radars. For reference, a McDonnell Douglas F-15 at an altitude of 6 km has a detection probability of 0.8 at this range. The electronic 'heart' of the system is a digital fire control system, which allows detection of up to 48 targets and the tracking of ten at any one time, and integrates IFF functionality; the IFF antenna being mounted above the search radar.

Radar 
The target engagement radar is a G band/H band (later K band) pulse doppler radar with an (in azimuth) passive electronically scanned array antenna. The radar is classed as a thinned array (design using fewer elements) incorporating only 570 phase shifters and uses linear polarization. The radar has an average power output of 0.6 kW providing a maximum detection range of 20 km/12 mi. An F-15 type aircraft had a detection probability of 0.8 at this range. Originally Tor could only engage one target at a time, and with only two of its missiles. Later variants of the Tor system (Tor-M1 and M2E) incorporate additional fire control channels, as well as improved fire control computers, allowing the system to engage two (M1) and then four (M2E) targets, while simultaneously guiding up to four (M1) and then eight (M2E) missiles. There is also a small antenna on the top of the target engagement radar to communicate with missiles after launch. Together these radars carry the NATO reporting name "Scrum Half". To reduce the dimensions of the vehicle, the target acquisition radar can be folded down horizontally when travelling, and the tracking radar can partially rotate away from vertical. To allow engagements in an ECM-heavy environment, the Tor missile system is equipped with an optical tracking system, complementing the main radar.

Mobility 
As a fully mobile system, the Tor is capable of acquiring and tracking targets while the TLAR is moving. Due to the interference with launch operations while in motion, missiles can be fired only when the system is stationary. Once set up, the reaction time (from target detection to engagement) is described as 5–8 seconds, depending on the variant; however, reaction time is somewhat longer (around 10 seconds) while in motion and firing in short halts. To facilitate this mode of operation, an auxiliary power unit (APU) is fitted so that the main engine can be shut down while the radar and missile system continue to operate when stationary, enabling long periods of readiness. The digital computers allowed for a higher degree of automation than any previous Soviet system of its type. Target threat classification is automatic and the system can be operated with little operator input, if desired.

Typical deployment
Typically, a battery of four Tor vehicles is accompanied by the mobile Ranzhir-M command center, which provides automatic interaction with the Tor, 9K33 Osa, 9K31 Strela-1, 2K22 Tunguska. It allows for efficient allocation of tasks between the individual Tor-M1 crews and allows each TLAR to be linked into a wider air defense system, thereby increasing target detection range and reducing reaction time.

Tor vehicles are accompanied by the mobile Polyana-D4, which provides automatic interaction with the Tor, Buk, 2K22 Tunguska, S-300V, (integrates all functions of several different systems into a single whole + various air force aircraft + direct transfer of target designation).

Tor-M1 receiving commands from Ranzhir-M / Polyana-D4 can shoot down targets in the range of 0–84 degrees. Tor-M1 system (the time of creating the version, 1991) can operate in a pair, then the angle of observation was 0–64 degrees (vertical).

Combat vehicle of antiaircraft Tor missile system provides simultaneous detection of up to 48 targets.

Missiles 

The rockets were developed for the interception of small, aggressively maneuvering targets.

Cold launched, the missiles are propelled out of the vehicle before the solid fuel rocket motor fires and the thrust vectoring system turns them toward their target. Missiles can also be fired against surface targets. Each missile is a sealed round, stored in two groups of four.

A new 9M338 missile has been developed by Almaz Antey offering improved range and precision. Its smaller size also enables the modified Tor-M2 to be equipped with 16 missiles as opposed to the original 8.

Variants

9K330 Tor 
The project was given strict design specifications to meet; Tor had to provide extended detection and tracking of fast, low radar cross section targets and be capable of quickly and efficiently dealing with massed air raids, while providing a high degree of automation and integration with other air defence assets.
To meet these demanding specifications, the designers used a variety of new technologies, including advanced passive electronically scanned array radar for improved detection and tracking performance, enhanced digital information processing, and vertically launched missiles to improve reaction time and increase the number of readily available munitions. After testing and evaluation between December 1983 and December 1984, the land-based system was accepted into service on 19 March 1986.

9K331 Tor-M1 
"Tor-M1", introduced in 1991 with the 9M331 missile, with greatly improved missile accuracy and the ability to engage two targets simultaneously, minimum range , minimum height .

Even while the Tor was being introduced into service, work started on improving the system, resulting in an enhanced version, the Tor-M1. Many improvements over the original system were made; these included the addition of a second fire control channel, allowing two targets to be engaged at once; as well as upgrades to the optical tracking system and computer equipment. ECM protection and warhead design were also modified, as was the ammunition handling system. State tests, conducted between March and December 1989, showed that the result was a system which could engage more targets in a shorter time frame with reaction times reduced by over a second and an increased probability of target destruction. Further modifications occurred partly as a response of insight gained from the 1995 NATO bombing in Bosnia and Herzegovina resulting in the Tor-M1-1, or Tor-M1V, which offered improved network connectivity and ECM functions as well as protection against countermeasures.

In 1993 Tor, in the test conditions reflecting targets employing defensive countermeasures, repeatedly downed small-sized rockets (similar to the much later and static complexes Iron Dome 1 target) with a 100% success rate. In comparison, Tor-M2E achieved a 100% rate in 2009, Tor-M2 a 100% rate in 2013 (10 km), and Tor-M2  a 100% rate in 2014, all in heavy ECM environments against four simultaneous small, high-speed targets.

9K332 Tor-M2E 

Upgrades have continued over the lifetime of the system, with developer Almaz Antey unveiling the newest incarnation of the Tor missile system, the Tor-M2E, at the MAKS Airshow in 2007.

The latest variant features:
 Improved fire control radar coverage, and
 Four guidance channels, allowing up to four targets to be engaged simultaneously.
 It has protection against spoofing.

Ammunition of the Tor-M2 includes 8 missiles 9M331 or 16 missiles 9M338 with increased altitude and range. Tor-M2 missiles have a range of 16 km, maximum altitude of 10 km and maximum speed of 1000 m/s. The system is capable of short-stop firing, which takes 2–3 seconds for the system to go from motion to stationary and firing of the missile.

The Tor-M2E is offered in either wheeled or tracked chassis and is equipped with a new digital computer system and all weather optical tracking system. It is currently produced at OJSC Izhevsk Electromechanical plant «Kupol».

 "Tor-M2E (9К332МE)" – with a 9А331МE tracked chassis mounting two 9M334 missile modules with four 9М9331 missiles. Crew of 2. The system is fully automated.
 "Tor-M2K (9К332МК)" – with a wheeled 9А331МК chassis developed by the Belarusian company «MZKT» mounting two 9M334 missile modules, each with four 9М9331 missiles.
"Tor-М2КМ (9К331МКМ)" – modular design (towed variant weight reduced to 15 tons), to accommodate various types of chassis. 9А331МК-1 TELAR mounting two 9M334 missile modules with four 9M9331 missiles. At MAKS-2013 this was shown on an Indian Tata chassis. The affected area expanded to height – 10 km, distance – 15. Crew of 2. Chance to destroy any target 98% as a minimum. Significantly improves the penetrating power of warhead fragments. The system is fully automated. Modules weighing 15 tons are installed on ships of the Russian Navy.

Tor-M1-2U 
"Tor-M1-2U" entered service at the end of 2012. This system is designed to destroy aircraft, helicopters, UAVs, missiles, and other precision guided weapons, flying at medium, low and very low altitudes in all weather. The system is able to engage four targets simultaneously at a height of up to 10 kilometers. Its crew consists of three people.
 Deliveries are underway. It can hit targets on the move, at a speed of up to 25 km/h (includes all the necessary functions for independent fight).

3K95 Kinzhal (naval variant) 

The 3K95 "Kinzhal" ( – dagger) is the naval version of the Tor missile system developed by Altair and has the NATO reporting name SA-N-9 Gauntlet. Using the same 9M330 missile as the land based version, the system can be mounted on vessels displacing over 800 tonnes and is known to be installed on  aircraft carriers, Kirov-class multimission cruisers,  anti-submarine destroyers and  frigates. The naval version of the later Tor-M1 is known as the "Yozh" ( – hedgehog), while the export version of the Kinzhal is known as "Klinok" ( – blade).

Despite starting testing earlier than its terrestrial counterpart, the naval variant, Kinzhal, had a more protracted development. After an extended testing period using a Project 1124  (including the engagement and destruction of four P-5 Pyatyorka (SSC-1a Shaddock) anti-ship missiles in 1986) Kinzhal finally entered service in 1989.

Stored within rotary VLS modules, the missiles are clustered into launchers comprising three to six modules (32 (Neustrashimy), 64 (Udaloy) or 192 (Kuznetsov, Kirov) missiles) and mounted flush to the deck. Each module has up to eight missiles stored ready to fire; during firing the missile is cold launched using a gas catapult before the launcher brings the next round to a firing position.

Fire control (FC) is handled by the 3R95 multi-channel FC system, (NATO reporting name Cross Swords), composed of two different radar sets, a G-band target acquisition radar (maximum detection range 45 km/28 mi,) and a K band target engagement radar, that handles the actual prosecution of a target.

Using two top mounted, mechanically scanned, parabolic target acquisition radars, the fire control system provides a 360 degree field of view, as well as IFF. The target engagement radar is a passive electronically scanned array antenna of the reflection type mounted on the front of the fire control system with a 60 degree field of view. Much like its land based sibling, the target engagement radar can track and guide eight missiles on up to four targets at once and is effective to a range of 1.5–12 km and an altitude of 10–6000 m. The system is managed by a crew of 13. Additional missile guidance antennae can be seen around the fire control system and the 3K95, like the upgraded Tor launchers, is equipped with a secondary infrared guidance system. The 3R95 can also provide fire control information for the vessels AK-630 close in weapons systems (CIWS) providing a second line of defence should anything penetrate the missile layer.

Tor-M2KM 
The Tor-M2KM is a self-contained fighting module version of the system that can be mounted in various locations. In October 2016, it was loaded onto the helipad of the Admiral Grigorovich frigate by means of an ordinary wharf crane and fixed in position with steel chains to fire at simulated cruise missiles while the ship was underway. This could give advanced SAM capabilities to vessels without the capacity to install the larger and heavier Kinzhal system; it can also be mounted on a truck, building roof, or any horizontal surface at least 2.5 m wide and 7.1 m long. The module weighs 15 tons and contains all equipment needed to operate without any external support. It can go from standby to full alert in 3 minutes and acquire 144 air targets while simultaneously tracking the 20 most dangerous ones marked for priority by the two-man crew. The Tor-M2 km missiles have a range of 15 km. In June 2022, it was installed on the helipad of the Vasily Bykov patrol boat. The system uses the new 9M331M surface-to-air missiles.

Tor-M2DT 

The system is especially designed to be used for Arctic region at temperatures up to −50 degrees °C based on the chassis of the DT-30PM tracked all-terrain vehicle and is capable of detecting over 40 air targets, especially high-precision weapons, and to track and engage up to four of them simultaneously at a range of up to 12 km and altitudes up to 10 km with its 16 missiles even on the move. Its creation was completed in 2018 and the first delivery of 12 systems was held in November of the same year. It was deployed in Ukraine in December 2022, with at least one system being destroyed by Ukrainian artillery using M982 Excalibur shells on 3 February 2023 along with a DT-30.

Tor-2E 
JSC Rosoboronexport, part of the Rostec State Corporation, has started promoting the newest Tor-E2 SAM system developed and produced by the Almaz-Antey Air and Space Defence Concern in 2018. Tor-E2 combat vehicle is an independent, mobile, all-terrain fighting unit that provides detection and identification of air targets on the march and at the halt, target lock-on and engagement at the halt, from a short stop and on the move. A battery of the four-channel Tor-E2 SAM systems, consisting of four combat vehicles, can simultaneously engage up to 16 targets flying from any direction at a range of at least 15 km and an altitude of up to 12 km. Each vehicle carries 16 missiles, twice as many as the previous version of the Tor system. In addition, the two Tor-E2 combat vehicles can operate in the "link" mode, which enables them to exchange information about the air situation at different altitude ranges and coordinate joint engagement operations. In this mode, one of the combat vehicles, acting from an ambush, receives information from the other one and does not reveal itself until the launch of the missile. A command post can be attached to a battery of four Tor-E2 combat vehicles to control and coordinate the Tor combat vehicles and interact with the customer's air defense control system.

HQ-17 (Chinese Variant) 

The HQ-17 is a Chinese development of the Tor-M1 system with a new chassis, IFF array, radar, and other electronics.

In 1996, China ordered 14 Tor-M1 missile systems from Russia which were delivered under contract in 1997. In 1999, another contract for 13 Tor-M1 systems was signed between Russia and China. Delivery of the systems took place in 2000.

FM-2000 
The FM-2000 is a mobile short-range air-defence (SHORAD) system unveiled by China Aerospace Science and Industry Corporation at the 2018 Zhuhai Airshow and in service as of 2019. Its range is 15 km and engagement altitude is 10 km. It is carried on a 3 axle TEL. It is a version of the HQ-17.

Combat history

Russo-Georgian War (2008)

In a press conference regarding the 2008 South Ossetia War, Russian defence ministry spokesperson Anatoliy Nogovitsyn speculated about the use of the Tor missile system by Georgian Armed Forces against attacking Russian aircraft suggesting it as a possible cause of the loss of a Tu-22MR strategic bomber, shot down by Georgian air-defences while on a reconnaissance mission during the conflict. Following analysis attributed the loss of the bomber to Georgian Buk-M1 system, which Georgia obtained from Ukraine in 2007.

Syrian War 

Since 30 September 2015, Russian military forces have been directly involved in the Syrian Civil War.
As part of the air defense, Tor-M2, along with the Pantsir-S1 point air defense system, has been deployed  at the Khmeimim Air Base, allegedly, on multiple occasions proving to be superior to the Pantsir-S1 in countering UAV swarm attacks, the vehicles destroyed more than 45 improvised UAVs as of June 2020.

On 9 April 2018, the Israeli Air Force reportedly destroyed an Iranian Tor system along with a drone hangar at Syria's T-4 airbase.  The system was not yet operational.

Shoot-down of Ukraine International Airlines Flight 752 

On 9 January 2020 it was reported by Newsweek that U.S. officials believed Ukraine International Airlines Flight 752 was shot down by an Iranian Tor-M1 missile, probably by accident. Later that day, Canadian Prime Minister Justin Trudeau announced that there was credible allied and Canadian intelligence that an Iranian surface-to-air missile likely caused the loss of the Ukrainian airliner. He would not elaborate further on the intelligence. Eliot Higgins of Bellingcat tweeted photographs of a Tor nose section with its distinctive canards, claimed to be taken at the crash site. On 11 January 2020, Iran admitted that it had shot down the Ukrainian airliner due to human error but Iran didn't close the air space because of war situation, and on 20 January, Iran's Civil Aviation Organization confirmed that "two Tor-M1 missiles [...] were fired at the aircraft."

Worried about an Israeli strike, according to previous military intelligence, similar incidents happened before, with one in particular directly mentioning Iranian Revolutionary Guards Tor-M1 batteries firing a missile toward a civilian airliner by mistake in June 2007.

2020 Nagorno-Karabakh War 

On 9 November 2020, the Azerbaijan Ministry of Defence published a video showing the destruction of an Armenian Tor-M2KM system in the vicinity of Khojavend. A drone tracked the vehicle as it parked inside a garage where it was subsequently struck by an IAI Harop "kamikaze" drone and multiple guided bombs.

2022 Russo-Ukrainian War  
 
In 2022, Tor missiles are being used by the Russian armed forces during its invasion of Ukraine. Several systems were reportedly abandoned by the Russian army after being stuck in mud, some of them photographed by individuals. One such photo, featuring a man named "Igor", garnered considerable attention on Twitter.

Operators

Current operators
 – Tor M2E, deliveries in 2018
 – Several batteries of Tor-M2E.
 – At least 2 combat vehicles procured in 2019 
 – 2 batteries (4 vehicles each) delivered as of 10 January 2013. Third battery delivered in 2013. +5 Tor-M2K ordered in 2016 and delivered in 2018. Additional systems were delivered and ordered in 2016 and 2017. 6 batteries of Tor-M2EK as of late 2022.
  – 35 60 9К331 «Tor-M1» in 2013. Superseded by the HQ-17.
  – 6
  – 16 M1s+ at least one M2s in service
  – 25 systems, 100 CVS, 84 Hellenic Army, 16 Hellenic Air Force The Greek Defense Minister Nikos Panagiotopoulos has offered to exchange Russian military equipment for US supplied equipment. He has offered to exchange the S-300 missile system for a Patriot missile system. Saying: “The same procedure applies to any other Russian-made air defense system that they may want to send to Ukraine.” Such an offer would include any Greek Tor-M1 systems.
  – 29
 
  – Three battalions of Tor-M1 missile systems are deployed in a point-defence role for critical areas
  
  – 171. 116 Tor-M1-2Us and M2s were delivered in 2012–2017. 6 Battalions of Tor-M2 consisting of 12 combat vehicles each were delivered as of 2019. More Tor-M2 (9K332) and Tor-M2DT (9K331MDT) in production. 2 sets were delivered in 2022.
  – 6 were spotted at 2018 Independence Day Parade. 6—16 as of 2021. 
  – 12 in 2012, later +26 on order

Former operators
  – Passed on to successor states

See also
Pantsir-S1
Morfey

References

External links 
 
 Almaz-Antey, Tor Design Bureau
 Kupol, Tor Manufacturer
 Federation of American Scientists page 
 Anti-Aircraft Missile System TOR-M1 Tutorial, includes technical description, specifications, and schematic, provided by the Ministry of Education and Science of the Russian Federation, Baltic State Technical University Voenmech

Surface-to-air missiles of Russia
Close-in weapon systems
Surface-to-air missiles of the Soviet Union
Naval surface-to-air missiles
Almaz-Antey products
Self-propelled anti-aircraft weapons of Russia
Military vehicles introduced in the 1980s